Rani Lila Ramkumar Bhargava was an Indian freedom fighter, social worker, educationist and a former leader of the Indian National Congress. She was an associate of Indian prime minister, Indira Gandhi and was married into the family of Munshi Nawal Kishore, the founder of reportedly the oldest printing press in Asia, Nawal Kishore Press, to Munshi Ramkumar Bhargava, a fourth generation member of the family and the holder of the title of Raja from Lord Wavell, then Viceroy of India,

Her son, Ranjit Bhargava is a noted environmentalist and a Padma Shri awardee. She was honoured by the Government of India in 1971 with Padma Shri, the fourth highest Indian civilian award.

She left three sons and a daughter.

She died on 25 May 2014 at Bangalore, Karnataka, aged 92.

References

Recipients of the Padma Shri in social work
Social workers
Indian women educational theorists
Year of birth missing
2014 deaths
Politicians from Bangalore
Indian National Congress politicians from Karnataka
Indian independence activists from Karnataka
20th-century Indian women scientists
Gandhians
20th-century Indian educational theorists
Women Indian independence activists
20th-century Indian women politicians
20th-century Indian politicians
Scholars from Bangalore
Social workers from Karnataka
Women educators from Karnataka
Educators from Karnataka
20th-century women educators
Women members of the Karnataka Legislative Assembly